Enfield City Football Club was a semi-professional association football club based in Adelaide, South Australia. Enfield City played in the FFSA South Australian State League up to 2014. Their home ground was Rushworth Reserve at Blair Athol, north of Adelaide.

Honours 
Premier League – Champions 2011
State League – Champions 2009
Premier League – Runners up 2006 & 2007
State League – Runners up 2002
1st  Division League Champions – 1961, 1983, 1993
2nd  Division Champions – 1940, 1951, 1957, 1962
3rd Division Champions – 1960

Federation Cup Winners – 1923, 1961
Federation Cup Runners Up – 1924, 1953, 1961, 1965, 1966, 1980
Ampol Cup Winners – 1963

External links 
 
 Long-term future of Enfield City Soccer Club in doubt after Falcons withdraw from State League 

National Premier Leagues clubs
Soccer clubs in South Australia
Association football clubs established in 1946
1946 establishments in Australia